Abernethy is a village in the Canadian province of Saskatchewan within the Rural Municipality of Abernethy No. 186 and Census Division No. 6. It is about one hour east of Regina, one hour west of Yorkton, and approximately five hours northwest of Winnipeg. To the south of Abernethy lies the Qu'Appelle Valley in which Katepwa Beach is located.

The current mayor is Kevin Stryker, and the village council consists of Janet Englot, Marty Fayant, Mark Harrison, and Colin Ward.

History 
Abernethy was incorporated as a village on July 26, 1904. Abernethy celebrated its one hundredth anniversary in the summer of 2004 with a centennial celebration held at the same time as the annual agricultural fair.

Historic sites 

 Abernethy is home to the Motherwell Homestead, which is a National Historic Site and is the original homestead of Saskatchewan's first minister of agriculture W.R. Motherwell.
 Abernethy and District Memorial Hall is a Municipal Heritage Property, that was constructed in 1921, to commemorate the return of soldiers from World War I.  Funds for the hall were raised through local donations in the community. The hall was designed by  Storey and Van Egmond of Regina.
 Christ Anglican Church is a Municipal Heritage Property, that was constructed near Abernethy in 1886, and relocated into the village in 1904.

Demographics 

Economy 

Abernethy is primarily an agricultural community. Businesses in this village include an ice cream store called Grammies, a photographery business named Alena Snaps, a crochet business named Country Cozy Crochet, as well as a CO-OP gas and grocery store. All these local businesses can be found on Facebook.

Education 

For schooling, children are bussed to Lemberg and Neudorf in the east and Balcarres in the west. Abernethy School was closed in 1994 and, due to lack of proper maintenance, had to be destroyed in the summer of 2005.

See also

 List of communities in Saskatchewan
 Villages of Saskatchewan

References

External links 

Villages in Saskatchewan
Abernethy No. 186, Saskatchewan
Division No. 6, Saskatchewan